Li Xuemei is a Chinese professional track cyclist.

Career
Li first represented Hebei province at the National Games of China in the 100m hurdles. She later represented Hebei in cycling. She made news for completing the 500m cycling sprint in 33.898 seconds during the 2009 National Games of China, defeating Chinese olympians Guo Shuang and Jiang Cuihua.

Injury
During training for the National Games of China in 2012, Li fractured her clavicle.

Career results
2012
1st  Team Sprint, Asian Track Championships
2013
1st  Team Sprint, Asian Track Championships
2015
3rd  Team Sprint, Asian Track Championships (with Shi Jingjing)
2017
3rd  500m Time Trial, Asian Track Championships

National competitions

References

Cyclists from Hebei
Keirin cyclists
Chinese female cyclists
1988 births
Living people
People from Langfang